Gliese 422 b is an exoplanet orbiting the red dwarf Gliese 422 (Innes' star). Gliese 422 b was discovered in 2014, and discovery was confirmed in 2020. It has a minimum mass of about ten times that of Earth.

It is located on the inner edge of circumstellar habitable zone (HZ) of Gliese 422, which extends from 0.11 to 0.21 astronomical units. Gliese 422 b's semi-major axis is 0.119 astronomical units and its orbital period is 26.161 Earth days.

References

External links 
 

Giant planets in the habitable zone
Exoplanets discovered in 2014
4
Exoplanets detected by radial velocity